"Beauty and the Beast" is a song by the American singer-songwriter Stevie Nicks. It is the final track on her second album The Wild Heart, released in 1983. It was later released in a live version from Nicks 1986 Rock a Little tour as a B-side to the UK single "Whole Lotta Trouble" in October 1989. It also appears on two compilations: Timespace – The Best of Stevie Nicks, released in 1991, and the boxset, Enchanted, released in 1998. A new studio version appears on her album, The Soundstage Sessions, released in 2009.

Inspiration and interpretations
The song receives its titles and initial inspiration from French filmmaker Jean Cocteau's 1946 film Beauty and the Beast, one of Stevie Nicks' favorite classic films. Nicks explains the importance of the song to her, both during live performances and in various interviews, as one that encompasses her whole life and represents how everyone is either a beauty or a beast, usually both
On its re-release in Timespace – The Best of Stevie Nicks (1991), she dedicates the song to Vincent and Catherine, of the late 80's television show, "Beauty and the Beast."

Studio session
"Beauty and the Beast" was recorded during a single three-hour session in Gordon Perry's recording studio. It is recorded with a full string orchestra and grand piano. During the recording session, Stevie Nicks and her back-up vocalists wore long black gowns and served champagne to the visiting musicians.

Personnel (1983 studio version)
Main performers
Stevie Nicks – vocals
Roy Bittan – piano
Sharon Celani – backup vocals
Lori Perry – backup vocals

String section 
Paul Buckmaster – arranger & conductor
Gene Bianco – harp
Jesse Levine – viola
Julien Barber – viola
Theodore Israel – viola
Harry Zaratzian – viola
Jesse Levy – cello
Frederick Zlotkin – cello
Seymour Barab – cello
Jon Abramowitz – cello
Marvin Morgenstern – violin
Herbert Sorkin – violin
John Pintavalle – violin
Max Ellen – violin
Regis Eandiorio – violin
Harry Glickman – violin
Peter Dimitriades – violin
Paul Winter – violin
Matthew Raimondi – violin
Harry Cykman – violin
Raymond Kunicki – violin
Lewis Eley – violin
Ruth Waterman – violin
Paul Gershman – violin

Personnel (2009 studio version)
Main performers
Stevie Nicks – vocals, producer
Sharon Celani – backup vocals
Lori Nicks – backup vocals
Jana Anderson – backup vocals

String section
Eric Roth – conductor
Janice MacDonald – flute
Deb Stevenson – oboe
Greg Flint – horn
Christine Worthing – horn
Guillaume Combet – violin
Jennifer Cappelli – violin
Carmen Llop-Kassinger – violin
Christine Keiko Abe – violin
Carol Cook – viola
Jocelyn Davis-Beck – cello
Eddie Bayers – drums
Michael Rhodes – bass
Joe Thomas – keyboards

Live performance
During her 2006 and 2007 tours, Stevie Nicks performed "Beauty and the Beast" as her encore. For this number, she changed into a black dress and styled her hair into an up-do to resemble Belle from the 1946 film. Footage from the film played in the background as well while she performed. Due to issues obtain copyrights for the 1946 film, a performance of the song was cut from the final edit of her 2009 Live in Chicago DVD. Instead, a new studio version recorded in Nashville in January 2008 appears on the accompanying album, The Soundstage Sessions.

External links
 Stevie Nicks on Beauty and the Beast Quotes by Nicks about the song, gathered from interviews throughout the years.
 Beauty and the Beast at The Nicks Fix Lyrics and information about the song.

References

Stevie Nicks songs
1983 songs
Songs written by Stevie Nicks
Song recordings produced by Jimmy Iovine